Metridiidae is a family of sea anemones in the order Actiniaria.

Characteristics
Members of the family Metridiidae are characterised by having a mesogloeal sphincter muscle and by the mesenterial arrangement, with the mesenteries not being divided into macronemes and microcnemes. The acontia typically have microbasic b-mastigophors and microbasic amastigophors, though the latter are not always present in adults.

Genera
The following genera are recognised by the World Register of Marine Species (WoRMS):

Metridium Blainville, 1824
Paraisometridium Zamponi, 1978

Of these, Metridium is the most speciose while Paraisometridium is monotypic.

References

 
Metridioidea
Cnidarian families